Kamur Sukhteh (also Romanized as Kamūr Sūkhteh; also known as Kahūr Sūkhteh) is a village in Howmeh Rural District, in the Central District of Lamerd County, Fars Province, Iran. At the 2006 census, its population was 31, in 6 families.

References 

Populated places in Lamerd County